Association Sportive du Port Autonome de Cotonou BC, better known as ASPAC BC is a Beninese basketball club based in Cotonou. It is the basketball team of the Port Autonome de Cotonou, one of the chief ports in Benin. The team plays in the Benin Basketball Super League.

In 2005 and 2007, ASPAC played in the FIBA Africa Champions Cup with its best result being the 5th place in 2007. In October 2019, ASPAC played in the qualifying tournaments for the Basketball Africa League.

In African competitions
FIBA Africa Clubs Champions Cup  (2 appearances)
2007 – Tenth Place
2009 – Sixth Place
BAL Qualifiers (1 appearance)
2020 – First Round

Players

Current roster 
The following is the ASPAC BC roster for the 2022 BAL Qualifying Tournaments.

References

External links
Aspac at Afrobasket

Basketball teams in Benin
Cotonou
Basketball teams established in 1968
1968 establishments in Africa
Road to BAL teams